Balthasaria mannii is a species of plant in the Pentaphylacaceae family. It is endemic to São Tomé Island.

References

Flora of São Tomé Island
Pentaphylacaceae
Vulnerable plants
Taxonomy articles created by Polbot